Magic Kombat is a 1995 Philippine fantasy comedy film written and directed by Junn Cabreira. The film stars Smokey Manaloto and Eric Fructuoso. It was one of the entries in the 1995 Metro Manila Film Festival.

Cast
 Smokey Manaloto as Mario
 Eric Fructuoso as Luigi
 Dandin Ranillo as Janitor
 Beth Tamayo as Diana
 Joanne Pascual as Rio
 Sharmaine Suarez as Blanka
 Ernie Ortega as Samurai Man
 Aga Fazon as Gorilla
 Jan Cassie Espolong as Goko
 Cita Astals as School Dean
 Jaime Fabregas as Asst. Dean
 Francis Enriquez as Student
 Nonong de Andres as Albularyo
 Solita Carreon as Recruiter
 Cris Daluz as Uncle Teong

Awards

References

External links

1995 films
1995 fantasy films
Filipino-language films
Philippine fantasy comedy films
Moviestars Production films